Jaime "Mujahid" Fletcher is a filmmaker and member of National Association of Latino Independent Producers (NALIP). He is the owner and CEO of an advertising agency, FocusPoint Studios.

Fletcher was former Catholic Christian.

He studied Christianity, Hinduism, Buddhism and Islam. He converted to Islam at a Muslim convention in Florida.

He is a youth advocate and founder of the Andalucia Media Arts Center. As a public speaker, he has covered topics about Latinos, youth, Islam, film and media at many institutions. Fletcher is the founder of IslamInSpanish, a non-profit organization dedicated to producing Spanish multimedia to "educate Latinos about Islam worldwide".

See also

Latino Muslims
Black Muslims
Islam in the United States
Latin American Muslims

References

Living people
American chief executives
Converts to Islam
American Sunni Muslims
American former Christians
Year of birth missing (living people)